Dongargaon is a village located in  Indore District,  Madhya Pradesh, India.

Geography 

Dogargaon is located in Mhow tehsil of Indore District in Madhya Pradesh. Dogargaon is represented by Dr. Ambedkar Nagar-Mh assembly constituency in State Assembly and  Dhar parliamentary constituency in Lok Sabha.

Universities and colleges 
 Dr. B.R. Ambedkar University of Social Sciences

References

Villages in Indore district